Robert Jordan (August 8, 1867 – April 23, 1931) was a Negro leagues First baseman for several years before the founding of the first Negro National League.

In 1903, he was playing as First baseman for the Cuban X-Giants at the age of 29. There he was playing with famous players of the day, including Charlie Grant, Jap Payne, Rube Foster, and Big Bill Smith. He stayed with the X-Giants for at least three seasons before moving on.

In 1906, Jordan moved to the Philadelphia Giants for a year, then played with the Brooklyn Royal Giants in 1907.

References

External links

Cuban X-Giants players
Philadelphia Giants players
Brooklyn Royal Giants players
1867 births
1931 deaths
20th-century African-American people